George Lopez (born 1961) is an American comedian, actor, and talk show host.

George Lopez may also refer to:

People
 George Lopez (record label owner), American record label owner
 George López (1900–1993), Mexican woodcarver
 George A. Lopez (fl. from 1975), American academic

Television
 George Lopez (TV series), a TV series starring the comedian
George Lopez (character)